Metaxās or Metaxa may refer to:

Places
 Metaxas Line, fortifications in northeastern Greece in 1935–1940
 Metaxas, Greece, a village in the Greek region of Macedonia
 Metaxas Regime or 4th of August Regime, a short-lived authoritarian regime in Greece from 1936 to 1941

People with the surname
 Anastasios Metaxas (1862–1937), Greek architect and competitive marksman
 Andreas Metaxas (1790–1860), Greek politician
 Konstantinos Metaxas (1793–1870), Greek fighter of the Greek War of Independence and politician from Cephalonia
 Christina Metaxa (born 1992), Cypriot singer
 Dimitris Metaxas, Greek-American computer scientist
 Doris Metaxa (1911–2007), French tennis player
 Eric Metaxas (born 1963), American author
 Georges Metaxa (1899–1950, Romanian singer and actor
 Ioannis Metaxas (1871–1941), Greek general, prime minister and dictator
 Nemone Metaxas (born 1972), English DJ, presenter, producer, and athlete 
 Nikolas Metaxas (born 1988), Cypriot singer

Other uses
 Metaxa, a Greek brandy-based liqueur

See also
 Georg von Metaxa (1914–1944), Austrian tennis player